The Harvard Ichthus is a journal of Christian thought and expression published at Harvard University. It was founded in 2004. It has featured contributions by notable thinkers such as Jim Wallis, James Schall, Stanley Hauerwas and Peter Van Inwagen.  

In June 2009, the Ichthus staff started a blog. New posts appear each weekday. 

The Ichthus's faculty advisers are J. Mark Ramseyer and Wesley Jacobsen. Marla Frederick was a former adviser. Rev. Peter J. Gomes was adviser until his death in 2011.

In an age of skepticism, many come to Harvard with misconceptions about the Christian faith and its compatibility with a rigorous intellectual life. The Ichthus aims to engage with and, ultimately, defy those misconceptions. The Ichthus publishes pieces of writing that explore God and God’s creation, taking seriously the motto of Harvard University: “Veritas Christo et Ecclesiae,” in English “Truth for Christ and the Church.”

See also
Collegiate Network

References

External links
 The Harvard Ichthus

Religious magazines published in the United States
Student magazines published in the United States
Christian magazines
Ichthus
Magazines established in 2004
Magazines published in Boston